The 2021 Liberty Flames baseball team represented Liberty University during the 2021 NCAA Division I baseball season. The Flames played their home games at Liberty Baseball Stadium as members of the Atlantic Sun Conference They were led by fifth-year head coach Scott Jackson.

Previous season

The 2020 Liberty Flames baseball team notched a 10–7 (0–0) regular-season record. The season prematurely ended on March 12, 2020, due to concerns over the COVID-19 pandemic.

Game log 

Schedule Source:

Rankings

Awards and honors

References 

2021 ASUN Conference baseball season
2021
2021 in sports in Virginia
Liberty